Keegan Lowe (born March 29, 1993) is an American-born Canadian professional ice hockey defenceman. He is currently playing with Växjö Lakers in the Swedish Hockey League (SHL). Lowe was selected by the Carolina Hurricanes in the 3rd round (73rd overall) of the 2011 NHL Entry Draft and has played in 4 games in the National Hockey League (NHL) between the Hurricanes and the Edmonton Oilers. He is the son of longtime Oilers executive and former player Kevin Lowe and Olympic bronze medalist Karen Percy.

Playing career
As a youth, Lowe played in the 2006 Quebec International Pee-Wee Hockey Tournament with the Edmonton Oilers minor ice hockey team.

On March 13, 2013, the Carolina Hurricanes of the National Hockey League signed Lowe to a three-year, two-way contract. He made his NHL debut on April 9, 2015, during which he racked up 10 penalty minutes for two separate fights against NHL veteran Vincent Lecavalier.

In his fourth year within the Hurricanes organization, Lowe collected 3 goals and 12 points in 49 games during the 2016–17 season, before he was traded by Carolina to the Montreal Canadiens in exchange for Philip Samuelsson on February 21, 2017.

On July 1, 2017, Lowe signed as a free agent on a one-year, two-way deal with the Edmonton Oilers. He later signed a two-year contract with the Oilers on June 3, 2018.

Following three seasons within the Oilers organization, Lowe left the club as a free agent. Entering the delayed 2020–21 season, Lowe opted to continue his career in the AHL, securing a one-year contract with the San Diego Gulls, primary affiliate to the Anaheim Ducks, on January 11, 2021. In 44 regular season games as an alternate captain with the Gulls, Lowe added 2 goals and 6 points from the blueline.

As a free agent following his lone season with the San Diego Gulls, Lowe embarked on a European career, agreeing to a one-year contract with Italian based club, HC Bolzano of the ICE Hockey League on August 18, 2021.

At the conclusion of the season and his contract with Bolzano, Lowe continued his career abroad by signing a one-year deal for the 2022–23 season with Swedish top flight club, Växjö Lakers of the SHL, on July 23, 2022.

Career statistics

References

External links

1993 births
Living people
American men's ice hockey defensemen
Bakersfield Condors players
Bolzano HC players
Canadian ice hockey defencemen
Carolina Hurricanes draft picks
Carolina Hurricanes players
Charlotte Checkers (2010–) players
Edmonton Oilers players
Edmonton Oil Kings players
St. John's IceCaps players
San Diego Gulls (AHL) players
Växjö Lakers players